The Indian Institute of Management Ranchi (IIM Ranchi, IIM-R) is a public business school located in Ranchi, Jharkhand, India. IIM Ranchi was established in Ranchi on 15 December 2009 and began classes on 6 July 2010, under the 11th Five Year Plan.

The institute offers various managements courses like Masters in Business Administration (MBA), Doctorate in Business Administration and Management (PhD), Post-Doc Fellowship Programme, 5-year Integrated Programme in Management (IPM BBA+MBA) and Executive MBA Programmes.

History

The 11th Five-Year Plan, endorsed by the National Development Council in December 2007, envisaged the establishment of six new IIMs.

IIM Ranchi, like all other IIMs, is an autonomous institution under the Ministry of Human Resources Development, Government of India. The institute is free to design its own curriculum and recruit faculty members. In April 2011, Union Minister Kapil Sibal announced that the government is mulling enhancement of the autonomy of IIMs by allowing them to select the director and the chairman of the board of directors.

IIM Ranchi is amongst the six new IIMs that were approved by the Union Cabinet on 27 August 2009. M. J. Xavier was the founding director of the institute.

Campus

From its establishment in 2009, IIM Ranchi operated from a temporary campus in Suchana Bhavan, behind the Governor House premises in the heart of Ranchi, with student hostels at Khelgaon. In 2021 the institute started moving to a permanent campus, on a plot of 60 acre plot in Dhurwa.

Academics

Academic programmes
IIM Ranchi offers a master's degree in management as per the approval of the Indian Institute of Management Bill, 2017. Students are awarded degrees under two-year full-time residential programs, MBA, MBA-HRM and MBA-BA. IIM Ranchi also offers Doctor of Business Administration (DBA) fellowship programmes and a part-time executive program (PGEXP). Further, IIM-R is now aming the five IIMs to offer the five-year Integrated Programme in Management (IPM).

Rankings

IIM Ranchi was ranked 15 by the National Institutional Ranking Framework (NIRF) management ranking in 2022.

Admissions 
Admission to post-graduate courses8 at IIM Ranchi is done based on merit in the Common Admission Test (CAT) conducted by the IIMs. For the five-year IPM (BBA+MBA) course, IIM-R accepts applications through IIM Indore's IPM AT as well as CollegeBoard's SAT. Students shortlisted on the basis of their test scores and Class 12 exams face a Personal Interview (PI) round.

Student life

As of 2019, the total student body consisted of fewer than 1000 students in the MBA, doctoral and executive programs.

Student bodies
IIM Ranchi is a completely student-driven business school. All the student bodies, such as Committees, Clubs, SIGs and Independent Bodies at IIM Ranchi, are managed by the students themselves and are governed by the Council for Student Affairs led by Senate members. They are responsible for spearheading student activities and acting as a liaison between the college administration and the students. The Council for Student Affairs also consists of seven Committee representatives, who along with Senate form the Student Council of IIM Ranchi.

There are a total of 7 Committees that form the backbone of IIM Ranchi's functioning namely:

 Academic Committee 
 Alumni and International Relations Committee
 Cultural Committee
 Media & PR Cell
 Sports Committee
 Student Facilities Committee
 Technology Committee

There are a total of 9 Clubs which drive IIM Ranchi:

 The Marketing Club 'Marquess' 
 The Finance Club 'Finopsis'
 The Operations and General Management Club 'Sankriya'
 The Social Responsibility Club 'Samarpan'
 The Consulting Club 'Conundrum'
 The Entrepreneurship Club 'E-Cell'
 The HR Club 'HiRe' 
 The 'Literary Club' and
 The Analytics Club 'Digitalytics'

IIM Ranchi has 8 Special Interest Groups (SIGs), which are associations of like-minded students working towards attaining proficiency in a special interest.
 
 High Note: Official Music band 
 Froggy Feet: Official Dance group 
 Dramebaaz: Dramatics Society 
 SOUL: Society for Objective and Unified Learning 
 Grayscale: Official creative group of IIMR 
 PRISM: IIMR's Placement Resources and Information Sharing Medium 
 Polynomics: The Public Policy and Economics Group 
 QR Code: The Quizzing fraternity of IIMR

IIM R also has independent bodies that function autonomously in tandem with Student Council to fulfil the institute's goals in various domains.

 UNGC-PRME IIM Ranchi
 IIM Ranchi Toastmasters
 Visual Branding and Content Body (VBCB)
 Institute's Innovation Council - IIM Ranchi
 Counseling Cell
 Gender Sensitization Committee
 Placement Committee has a responsibility to foster corporate relations and conduct of the summer and final placement process.

Conclaves and Conferences 
AGON - The Annual Management Fest
With events in the various business fields of finance, marketing, consulting, human resources and communications, organized in the form of case studies, quizzes, essays, debates and more, AGON draws huge participation from local and national colleges.

AAROHAN Leadership Speak Series
IIM Ranchi hosted its first leadership speak series named "Aarohan" on 8 January 2016 at Cockerel Stadium, Dipatoli cantonment, Ranchi. The idea of this is to invite role models across various fields to come and address the IIM Ranchi community, particularly the students. It is a leadership talk series aimed at student interaction with leaders and innovators of their respective fields to promote intellectual growth, stimulation and facilitate the development of a more inclusive world-view. Lt Gen Arun Kumar Sahni, Uttam Yudh Seva Medal, ADC, General Officer Commanding-in-Chief, South Western Command of Indian Army and Dr. Y.V.N. Krishna Murthy, Director, National Remote Sensing Centre, ISRO have been a part of the series

 Colloquium
Colloquium is an annual series of guest lectures, where students of IIM Ranchi get an opportunity to interact with the industry leaders in finance, marketing, operations and HR that happen throughout the year. The speakers also deliver insights along with discussions on various contemporary issues faced by India.Some of the renowned speakers are: Mr. Amar Abrol, MD and CEO, AirAsia India. Mr. Amit Vaish, Director and Head HR, Barclays India. Mr. Satish Shah, Head of Human Capital, De Shaw India. Mr. Anirudh Patil, Director of Strategy & Operations, McKinsey & Co. Mr. Shashank Saxena, Vice President of Technology, Morgan Stanley.

HR Conclave
IIM Ranchi being the only IIM to offer specialised course in Human Resource Management, have organised two HR conclaves themed as "Turning the tide on unrest in workforce " in 2012 and "Holistic Development of Human Capital" in 2011, leaders across industry discussed the challenges faced by organizations and the role of HR managers in solving those challenges. Dignitaries like K.A. Narayan, President-HR, Raymond, Mr. Sandeep Choudhary, Partner, Aon Hewitt, Mr. Partha Dasgupta, CEO, Apogee Leads, Mr. R. Sridhar, Vice President-HR, ITC Limited any many others discussed about HR practices.

 RADIX- The Annual Business Conclave
Based on the themes "Connect," "Enthuse," and "Foster," Radix connects students with industry leaders. The aim is to facilitate a quality interaction among the experts and the students along with exchange of ideas regarding various industrial growth factors and the development of a shared vision for the future. Leaders from organizations such as KPMG, Ernst & Young, Lenovo, Godrej etc. have been a part of Radix 2017.
 RUSH- The Annual Sports and Cultural Fest
This two-day festival, the flagship of IIM Ranchi, includes events like Cricket, Lawn Tennis, Football, Athletics, Volleyball, Badminton (Men/Women), Table Tennis (Men/Women), Throwball, Theme Photography, Solo Dance, Duet Dance, War of Bands, T-shirt painting, Comedy Shayari etc.,

See also
 List of universities in India
 Indian Institutes of Management

References

Other Information
 IIM Ranchi official website

Ranchi
Business schools in Jharkhand
Indian Institute of Management Ranchi
Educational institutions established in 2009
2009 establishments in Jharkhand